Other speedways at state fairgrounds can be found at State Fairgrounds Speedway (disambiguation)

State Fairgrounds Speedway, located at the North Carolina State Fairgrounds in Raleigh, North Carolina, was a half-mile oval dirt racetrack which was the site of auto races for NASCAR's top series in 1955, 1969, and 1970.  The race on September 30, 1970 was the final Grand National race ever held on a dirt track, until the 2021 season. It was won by Richard Petty in a Plymouth that had been sold by Petty Enterprises to Don Robertson and rented back for the race.

While the track itself has largely been removed, the grandstand, now called the Sam G. Rand Grandstand, remains and is used for events related to the North Carolina State Fair.

References 

NASCAR tracks
Motorsport venues in North Carolina
Sports venues in Raleigh, North Carolina